William Frank "Dunny" Goode  (October 24, 1929 – June 1, 2004) was an American football coach.  He was the tenth head football coach for Eastern New Mexico University in Portales, New Mexico, serving for five seasons, from 1978 to 1982, and compiling a record of 21–29–1.

Goode was born October 24, 1929, to parents Grant and Giggy Goode.  He was delivered at home, outside of Pampa, Texas, in a tent dugout.  He grew up in Pampa, Texas and Midland, Texas.  Goode was a celebrated athlete throughout his educational career.  Goode attended Hardin–Simmons University.  While at University, Goode met Betty Ann Greene, whom he would later marry.  A two-way college player at Hardin–Simmons University, Goode was the Washington Redskins' top draft choice in 1951.  Goode only had hours to celebrate this achievement, however.  Hours after receiving the call to play for the Redskins, Goode received notice that he was to serve in the Korean War.

Goode fought for the ability to go to practices with the Redskins.  He gained a position in the United States Air Force, and was re-stationed in Washington, allowing him to continue training with the Redskins.  Goode was called to Korea prior to the inaugural game of the season.

After military service, Goode took a job as a graduate assistant at Hardin–Simmons, and then got his first high school coaching position in Lefors, Texas.  Goode coached at numerous schools throughout Texas.

in the 1970s, Goode left Texas to coach in Clovis, New Mexico, to be closer to his ranch property outside of Fort Sumner, New Mexico.  That enabled him to be "the right person at the right time to kick off a high school football dynasty."

Moving to the head high school position in 1973, Goode took the Clovis Wildcats to two state championships in his five years at Clovis High School.

"Clovis always had good football teams. But... Dunny was the one that got them over the edge", said Clovis coach Eric Roanhaus, who took over for Goode in 1978.

"He's the one that created the monster – and I've been trying to feed it ever since", Roanhaus said.

Goode then took the head coaching position at Eastern New Mexico University in 1978. Five years later, Goode left ENMU, embarking on a high-powered coaching odyssey that took him to Roswell, New Mexico, Goddard, Farmington, New Mexico, and, finally, at the University of Texas at El Paso (UTEP).  Goode and his wife retired at the close of the school year in 1993.

Goode died June 1, 2004 in Clovis.

References

External links
 

1929 births
2004 deaths
Eastern New Mexico Greyhounds football coaches
Hardin–Simmons Cowboys football coaches
Hardin–Simmons Cowboys football players
High school football coaches in New Mexico
High school football coaches in Texas
People from Midland, Texas
People from Pampa, Texas
Players of American football from Texas
People from Clovis, New Mexico
Neurological disease deaths in New Mexico
Deaths from Alzheimer's disease